The third elections for the Assembly of Experts in Tehran Province was held on 23 October 1998 to elect 16 representatives in the constituency. The result was a victory for the conservatives. Allied institutions the Combatant Clergy Association and the Society of Seminary Teachers of Qom supported candidates jointly, while the Association of Combatant Clerics and the Assembly of Qom Seminary Scholars and Researchers whose most members were disqualified by the Guardian Council did not support any candidates. Executives of Construction Party was the only reformist group that competed in the election.

The voter turnout was declared 39.45% in the constituency.

Results

References 

Elections in Tehran
1990s in Tehran
1998 elections in Iran